Jay Marshall may refer to:

Jay Marshall (magician) (1919–2005), magician and ventriloquist
Jay Marshall (baseball) (born 1983), Major League Baseball pitcher